The People's Deputies of Ukraine of the 6th convocation were elected in the snap parliamentary elections on September 30, 2007. The elections were held under the proportional system according to electoral lists of political parties and electoral blocks of political parties in Ukraine. The 6th convocation ended on 14 December 2012 (six weeks after the 2012 parliamentary elections).

According to the results of early elections the following political forces got in the Verkhovna Rada:
 Party of Regions with 34.37% of votes
 Yulia Tymoshenko Bloc, BYuT with 30.71%
 Our Ukraine–People's Self-Defense Bloc with 14.15%
 Communist Party of Ukraine (CPU) with 5.39%
 Lytvyn Bloc with 3.96%

Together, these political forces gathered around 88.58% of the votes. All other political parties and blocks do not pass the electoral threshold of 3%. 2,73% of electors voted "against all".


Members

See also 
 2007 Ukrainian parliamentary election

References

Parliamentary election
2010-2014
 
6th Ukrainian Verkhovna Rada